Harun Jusoh (born 2 April 1948 in Terengganu) is a former Terengganu FA and Malaysia midfield player.

Career overview
A midfielder, Harun was a squad player for the Malaysia team in the 1972 Munich Olympics football competition, and also represented Malaysia when it finished third in the 1974 Asian Games in Iran.

On 11 May 1975, Harun is also part of the Malaysia Selection that played against Arsenal FC in a friendly match which his team won by 2-0 at Merdeka Stadium.

In 2004, he was inducted in Olympic Council of Malaysia's Hall of Fame for 1972 Summer Olympics football team.

Honours

Terengganu FA
Malaysia Cup runner-up: 1973
Malaysia FAM Cup: 1969

Malaysia
Asian Games bronze medal: 1974
Pestabola Merdeka: 1973

References

Living people
Malaysian footballers
1948 births
People from Terengganu
Association football midfielders
Olympic footballers of Malaysia
Footballers at the 1972 Summer Olympics
Terengganu FC players